A Yom Hillula (day of festivity) is another word for yahrzeit (the anniversary of a death). However, it differs from a regular yahrzeit in two respects. It refers specifically to the yahrzeit of a great Tzaddik who taught Kabbalah and/or Chassidus, and unlike a regular yahrzeit, which is marked with sadness and even fasting, a Yom Hillula is commemorated specifically through simcha (joy), and festive celebration. This term is most often used in Hasidic circles to refer to the day of the death of Hasidic Rebbes. According to Kabbalah, on the Yartzheit of a Tzaddik, all the spiritual redemption of their life shines into this World, contributing to the Messianic redemption and bringing spiritual blessing to all who are connected to them. The supreme Tzadik of the generation is described as the all-inclusive, general soul of the Jewish people, further emphasised in Hasidic doctrine. The observation of a hillula in North African Jewish communities is also widespread, especially in Morocco, with the Hiloula of Rabbi Isaac Ben Walid and the Hiloula of Rabbi Amram ben Diwan <--(the Yom Hillula of Rabbi Amram ben Diwan) among them, as well as the Baba Sali in the Israeli town of Netivot.

Rabbi Shimon Bar Yochai

The first Tzaddik whose Yom Hillula was celebrated is that of Rabbi Shimon bar Yochai, on Lag Baomer. Rabbi Shimon Bar Yochai referred to this day as Yom Simchato ("the day of his happiness") and a spiritual wedding. There is thus a very widely observed custom to visit the tomb of Rabbi Shimon bar Yochai in Meron, Israel on Lag Be'Omer, and celebrate with torches, song, and feasting. This celebration was a specific request by Rabbi Shimon bar Yochai of his students.

See also
Hiloula of Rabbi Haim Pinto
Tzadik
Ohel (grave)
Idra

External links
 Rabbi M.M. Schneerson on why chassidim rejoice on a Yom Hillula (Yiddish)

Kabbalah
Chabad terminology
Hebrew words and phrases in Jewish law